This is a list of state elections in South Australia for the bicameral Parliament of South Australia, consisting of the House of Assembly (lower house) and the Legislative Council (upper house).

See also
 List of South Australian House of Assembly by-elections
 List of South Australian Legislative Council appointments
 List of South Australian Legislative Council by-elections
 Electoral districts of South Australia
 Timeline of Australian elections

External links
Lower House results 1890-1965
Statistical Record of the Legislature 1836-2007, Parliament of SA, www.parliament.sa.gov.au

 
South Australia
Elections